Pilaki is a style of Turkish meze and may refer to several dishes that are cooked in a sauce made out of onion, garlic, carrot, potato, tomato or tomato paste, sugar, and olive oil. Beans prepared in this style (fasulye pilaki, with white beans, or barbunya pilaki, with borlotti beans) are served cold, garnished with parsley and slices of lemon. Fish pilaki is also a popular recipe. In Greek cuisine, this style is known as plaki. In Bulgarian cuisine the name is "plakiya".

See also
Gigandes plaki, a similar Greek dish
Piyaz, another Turkish bean dish
Rajma, an Indian dish.
Red beans and rice, a Louisiana Creole specialty.

References

Further reading
The Sultan's Kitchen: A Turkish Cookbook. Özcan Ozan. 2001. Periplus Editions. .
Companion Guide to Istanbul and Around the Marmara. John Freely, Susan Glyn. 2000. The Companion Guide. .
International Dictionary of Food & Cooking: Ingredients, Additives. Charles Gordon Sinclair. 1998. Taylor & Francis Cookery. .

External links
 Barbunya pilaki recipe

Turkish words and phrases
Western Armenian cuisine